John Barrow MA (1651 – 19 March 1684) was a Canon of Windsor from 1682–1684.

Career

He was educated at St Edmund Hall, Oxford and graduated BA in 1672, and MA in 1674.

He was appointed:
Chaplain to Sir William Temple, 1st Baronet, Ambassador to Holland
Chaplain to Prince Rupert of the Rhine
Vicar of New Windsor 1680

He was appointed to the twelfth stall in St George's Chapel, Windsor Castle in 1682, and held the stall until 1684.

Notes 

1651 births
1684 deaths
Canons of Windsor
Alumni of St Edmund Hall, Oxford